Zaporizhzhia Oblast is subdivided into districts (raions) which are subdivided into territorial communities (hromadas).

Current

On 18 July 2020, the number of districts was reduced to five. These are:
 Berdiansk (Бердянський район), the center is in the town of Berdiansk;
 Melitopol (Мелітопольський район), the center is in the town of Melitopol;
 Polohy (Пологівський район), the center is in the town of Polohy; 
 Vasylivka (Василівський район), the center is in the town of Vasylivka;
 Zaporizhzhia (Запорізький район), the center is in the city of Zaporizhzhia.

Administrative divisions until 2020

In 2020, Zaporizhzhia Oblast was subdivided into 25 regions: 20 districts (raions) and 5 city municipalities (mis'krada or misto), officially known as territories governed by city councils.

Cities under the oblast's jurisdiction:
Zaporizhzhia Municipality (Запоріжжя), the administrative center of the oblast
Cities and towns under the city's jurisdiction:
Zaporizhzhia
Urban districts under the city's jurisdiction:
Khortytskyi District
Komunarskyi District
Leninskyi District
Ordzhonikidzevskyi District
Shevchenkivskyi District
Zavodskyi District
Zhovtnevyi District
Berdiansk Municipality 
Cities and towns under the city's jurisdiction:
Berdiansk (Бердянськ)
Enerhodar (Енергодар)
Melitopol (Мелітополь)
Tokmak (Токмак)
Districts (raions):
Berdiansk (Бердянський район)
Urban-type settlements under the district's jurisdiction:
Andriivka (Андріївка)
Bilmak (Більмацький район), formerly Kuibysheve Raion
Urban-type settlements under the district's jurisdiction:
Bilmak (Більмак), formerly Kuibysheve, in 2021 renamed Kamianka
Komysh-Zoria (Комиш-Зоря)
Chernihivka (Чернігівський район)
Urban-type settlements under the district's jurisdiction:
Chernihivka (Чернігівка)
Huliaipole (Гуляйпільський район)
Cities and towns under the district's jurisdiction:
Huliaipole (Гуляйполе)
Urban-type settlements under the district's jurisdiction:
Zaliznychne (Залізничне)
Kamianka-Dniprovska (Кам'янсько-Дніпровський район)
Cities and towns under the district's jurisdiction:
Kamianka-Dniprovska (Кам'янка-Дніпровська)
Melitopol (Мелітопольський район)
Urban-type settlements under the district's jurisdiction:
Myrne (Мирне)
Mykhailivka (Михайлівський район)
Urban-type settlements under the district's jurisdiction:
Mykhailivka (Михайлівка)
Pryshyb (Пришиб)
Novomykolaivka (Новомиколаївський район)
Urban-type settlements under the district's jurisdiction:
Novomykolaivka (Новомиколаївка)
Ternuvate (Тернувате)
Orikhiv (Оріхівський район)
Cities and towns under the district's jurisdiction:
Orikhiv (Оріхів)
Urban-type settlements under the district's jurisdiction:
Komyshuvakha (Комишуваха)
Polohy (Пологівський район)
Cities and towns under the district's jurisdiction:
Polohy (Пологи)
Pryazovske (Приазовський район)
Urban-type settlements under the district's jurisdiction:
Novovasylivka (Нововасилівка)
Pryazovske (Приазовське)
Prymorsk (Приморський район)
Cities and towns under the district's jurisdiction:
Prymorsk (Приморськ)
Rozivka (Розівський район)
Urban-type settlements under the district's jurisdiction:
Rozivka (Розівка)
Tokmak (Токмацький район)
Cities and towns under the district's jurisdiction:
Molochansk (Молочанськ)
Vasylivka (Василівський район)
Cities and towns under the district's jurisdiction:
Dniprorudne (Дніпрорудне)
Vasylivka (Василівка)
Urban-type settlements under the district's jurisdiction:
Stepnohirsk (Степногірськ)
Velyka Bilozerka (Великобілозерський район)
Vesele (Веселівський район)
Urban-type settlements under the district's jurisdiction:
Vesele (Веселе)
Vilniansk (Вільнянський район)
Cities and towns under the district's jurisdiction:
Vilniansk (Вільнянськ)
Urban-type settlements under the district's jurisdiction:
Kamiane (Кам'яне)
Yakymivka (Якимівський район)
Urban-type settlements under the district's jurisdiction:
Kyrylivka (Кирилівка)
Yakymivka (Якимівка)
Zaporizhzhia (Запорізький район)
Urban-type settlements under the district's jurisdiction:
Balabyne (Балабине)
Kushuhum (Кушугум)
Malokaterynivka (Малокатеринівка)

References

Zaporizhia
Zaporizhzhia Oblast